Suuk-Chishma (Hıwıqşişmä) is a rural locality (a selo) in Podlubovsky Selsoviet, Karmaskalinsky District, Bashkortostan, Russia. The population was 591 as of 2010. There are 12 streets.

Geography 
Suuk-Chishma is located 19 km northwest of Karmaskaly (the district's administrative centre) by road. Sarsaz is the nearest rural locality.

References 

Rural localities in Karmaskalinsky District